All Areas – Worldwide is a double live album by Accept. It was released in Japan and the United States under the title The Final Chapter in 1998.

The first 14 tracks were recorded while Accept toured supporting their 1993 Objection Overruled release, while the final six tracks were recorded during support of their 1994 Death Row offering.

Track listing

Credits 
 Peter Baltes – bass guitar
 Udo Dirkschneider – vocals
 Wolf Hoffmann – guitars
 Stefan Kaufmann – drums, producer, mixing
 Stefan Schwarzmann – drums on tracks 4–9 on disc two

References 

Accept (band) albums
1998 live albums
GUN Records live albums
CMC International live albums